Anthelia may refer to:

 Anthelia (coral), a genus of soft coral
 Anthelia (plant), a genus of liverwort in the family Antheliaceae
 The plural of Anthelion, a rare optical phenomenon